Federal banking is the term for the way the Federal Reserve of the United States distributes its money.  The Reserve (often called with the abbreviation "Fed") operates twelve banking districts around the country which oversee money distribution within their respective districts.  The twelve cities which are home to the Reserve Banks are Boston, New York City, Philadelphia, Richmond, Atlanta, Dallas, Saint Louis, Cleveland, Chicago, Minneapolis, Kansas City, and San Francisco.

See also 
 Federal Reserve

External links 
 Official Federal Reserve Website

References 

Federal Reserve System